Cochon is a French word that may refer to:

Domestic pig
Piglet (animal)
Cochon, a restaurant in New Orleans;  see Cajun cuisine 
Slang meaning dirty pig, swine, contemptible person;  see Cultural references to pigs

People
Albert Auguste Cochon de Lapparent (1839–1908), French geologist
Charles Cochon de Lapparent (1750–1825), politician of the First French Republic and First French Empire 
Georges Cochon (1879–1959), a tapestry maker, anarchist, and secretary of the Federation of Tenants Biography

Other
Le Cochon, a 1970 film directed by Jean Eustache and Jean-Michel Barjol

See also
Cochonnaille